General elections were held in Belgium on 5 April 1925. The result was a victory for the Belgian Labour Party, which won 78 of the 187 seats in the Chamber of Representatives. Voter turnout was 92.8% in the Chamber election and 92.7% in the Senate election.

An extra seat in the Chamber of Representatives was assigned to the arrondissement of Verviers, after the annexation of Eupen-Malmedy.

Following the elections, Aloys Van de Vyvere formed a Catholic minority government. After he failed to receive the confidence of the other parties in parliament, a Catholic-Labour government was formed led by Prosper Poullet.

Results

Chamber of Representatives

Senate

References

Belgium
1920s elections in Belgium
1925 in Belgium
April 1925 events